Tarebia is a genus of freshwater snails, gastropod mollusks in the subfamily Thiarinae of the family Thiaridae.

Species
Species within the genus Tarebia include:
 † Tarebia acuta (J. Sowerby, 1822) 
 † Tarebia bojolaliensis (K. Martin, 1905) 
 † Tarebia cardinalis (Lapparent, 1938) 
 † Tarebia cerithioides (Rolle, 1858) 
 † Tarebia darmavangiensis (K. Martin, 1905) 
 Tarebia granifera (Lamarck, 1816)
 Tarebia hainesiana 
 † Tarebia issiracensis (Fontannes, 1884) 
 Tarebia invieta 
 Tarebia lateritia 
 Tarebia luzoniensis 
 † Tarebia preangerensis (K. Martin, 1905) 
 Tarebia semigranosa
 † Tarebia trimargaritifera (Ludwig, 1865) 
Synonyms
 Tarebia obliquegranosa (E.A. Smith, 1878): synonym of Tarebia granifera (Lamarck, 1816) (a junior synonym)

References

External links
 Adams, H. & Adams, A. (1853-1858). The genera of Recent Mollusca; arranged according to their organization. London, van Voorst. Vol. 1: xl + 484 pp.; vol. 2: 661 pp.; vol. 3: 138 pls
 Brot, A. (1874-1879). Die Melaniaceen (Melanidae) in Abbildungen der Natur mit Beschreibungen. In: Systematisches Conchylien-Cabinet von Martini und Chemnitz. Ersten Bandes, vierundzwanzigste Abtheilung. (1) 24 (229): 1-32, pls. 1-6 (1874); (1) 24 (235): 33-80, pls. 7-12 (1875); (1) 24 (244): 81-128, pls. 13-18 (1875); (1) 24 (249): 129-192, pls. 19-24 (1876); (1) 24 (259): 193-272, pls. 25-30 (1877); (1) 24 (264): 273-352, pls. 31-36 (1877); (1) 24 (271): 353-400, pls. 37-42 (1878); (1) 24 (280): 401-456, pls. 43-48 (1879); (1) 24 (283): 457-488, pl. 49 (1879). Nürnberg (Bauer & Raspe)

Thiaridae
Monotypic gastropod genera